Alistair Scott may refer to:

Ally Scott (born 1950), Scottish former professional football player
Alistair Scott (The Inbetweeners), a fictional wheelchair-using student appearing in some 2010 episodes of the British sitcom The Inbetweeners

See also
Alastair Scott (disambiguation)